Site 16, also known as SK-2, is a launch complex at the Plesetsk Cosmodrome in Russia. It consists of a single pad, Site 16/2, and has been used by R-7 derived rockets since 1960.

Site 16 was originally built for use by R-7A Semyorka missiles, however no launches were conducted from the complex whilst it was operational. After its retirement from service in 1966, it was cannibalised for parts which were needed to repair Site 31/6 at the Baikonur Cosmodrome following the explosion of a Soyuz-U rocket.

Work to rebuild the complex began in 1979, and was completed in 1981. The first launch from Site 16 was conducted by a Molniya-M with an Oko satellite on 19 February 1981.

Site 16 has been used for Soyuz-U and Molniya-M launches, and is still in service as of 2012.

References

Plesetsk Cosmodrome